Imeria is a genus of South American flowering plants in the family Asteraceae.

 Species
 Imeria memorabilis (Maguire & Wurdack) R.M.King & H.Rob. - Amazonas State in Venezuela, Amazonas State in Brazil
 Imeria serratifolia V.M.Badillo - Amazonas State in Venezuela

References

Asteraceae genera
Eupatorieae
Flora of South America